Bertram Walter Elles (3 July 1877 – 1963) of Wimbledon, London and was the son of Jamieson Elles. On 24 February 1906, Bertham married Jean Challoner Lake daughter of Cannon Henry Lake at Saint Mary Abbots, Kensington. Upon his retirement, the Elles lived in Hartfield, Sussex.

Education
Bertram received his education at Marlborough College and later admitted King's College on 2 October 1896, where he had a Bachelor of Arts in 1899. In 1903, he passed his Malay language.

Career
Bertram joined the Malayan Civil Service (1900 - 1932) and had posted to serve the Malay States in various positions before became the British Resident of Perak; below is the list of offices he held.

Acting Collecter of Land Revenue of Matang (1902), 
Second Assistant to Resident General (1903)
Acting Second Secretary to Resident General (1903)
Acting Secretary to Resident of Negeri Sembilan (1906)
Acting Commissioner and Secretary of Sanitary Board of North Kinta (1910)
Resident Councilor of Malacca from (16 November 1928 - 10 April 1930)
British Resident of Perak (1931 - 1932)

References

 Dominion Office and Colonial Office List, Great Britain Office of Commonwealth Relations (pg 670)
Corona, Great Britain Colonial Office, 1949 (pg 182)
World Statesmen

1877 births
1963 deaths
History of Perak
Administrators in British Malaya
People from Hartfield